The Malvern Wells War Memorial is located on Wells Road in the village of Malvern Wells near Great Malvern in Worcestershire. The memorial marks the deaths of local individuals who died fighting in World War I and World War II. It was dedicated in June 1920 by Lieutenant Colonel W. R. Chichester in the aftermath of the First World War. A a further inscription was later added to mark the Second World War. The memorial is a tall thin Portland stone octagonal pillar topped by a sculpture of a pelican vulning herself, a heraldic and Christian symbol of sacrifice.

The memorial was designed by the Arts and Crafts architect and designer C. F. A. Voysey. It has been Grade II listed on the National Heritage List for England since June 1973. Voysey's only other freestanding war memorial, the Potters Bar war memorial, was designed in 1920.

No names are recorded on the memorial; this was a deliberate decision to represent the many local people wounded but not killed in the war. It was built at a cost of £800–900.

Inscription
The memorial is inscribed:

References

1920 establishments in England
Sculptures of birds
Buildings and structures completed in 1920
Buildings and structures in Malvern, Worcestershire
Buildings by C.F.A. Voysey
Grade II listed buildings in Worcestershire
Grade II listed monuments and memorials
Malvern Hills
Outdoor sculptures in England
Pelicans
Stone sculptures in the United Kingdom
World War I memorials in England
World War II memorials in England